MKS Zagłębie Lubin is a Polish professional men's handball team based in Lubin in western Poland, that plays in Superliga. One time Polish Championship and Polish Cup winner.

Honours
 Superliga
Winners (1): 2006–07

 Polish Cup
Winners (1): 1992–93

Team

Current squad
Squad for the 2022–23 season

Goalkeepers
 12  Miłosz Byczek
 44  Marcin Schodowski
  Damian Procho

Left wingers
 23  Jakub Bogacz
  Rafał Krupa
Right wingers
 22  Wojciech Hajnos
  Arkadiusz Michalak
Line players 
3  Michał Stankiewicz
 20  Tomasz Pietruszko
 27  Jakub Adamski

Left backs
 10  Stanisław Gębala
 34  Michał Bekisz
Centre backs
8  Jakub Moryń
 24  Mikołaj Kupiec
 25  Mateusz Drozdalski
Right backs
 31  Patryk Iskra
  Danylo Hlushak

Transfers
Transfers for the 2022–23 season

 Joining
  Damian Procho (GK) (from  Stal Mielec)
  Rafał Krupa (LW) (from  Stal Mielec)
  Danylo Hlushak (RB) (from  HC Dragūnas Klaipėda)
  Arkadiusz Michalak (RW) (from  Śląsk Wrocław)

 Leaving
  Marek Bartosik (GK) (to  Grupa Azoty Unia Tarnów)
  Kamil Drobiecki (LW) (to ?)
  Marcel Sroczyk (LW) (to  Orlen Wisła Płock)
  Roman Chychykalo (RB) (to  Gwardia Opole)
  Kamil Netz (RB) (to  Grunwald Poznań)
  Marek Marciniak (RW) (to  Azoty Puławy)

References

External links
 Official website 

Polish handball clubs
Sport in Lower Silesian Voivodeship
Handball clubs established in 1967
1967 establishments in Poland
Lubin County